Phalonidia mayarina is a species of moth of the family Tortricidae. It is found on Cuba.

The wingspan is about 18.5 mm. The ground colour of the forewings is cream, preserved along the edges of the markings. The remaining area is suffused with brownish yellow with brown dots and strigulae (fine streaks). The hindwings are brownish grey.

References

Moths described in 2007
Phalonidia
Endemic fauna of Cuba